This is a list of zombie related novels that are notable themselves or by notable authors. 



Novels and anthologies

Nonfiction

Comic books

See also
List of apocalyptic and post-apocalyptic fiction

References

Comics-related lists
Lists about role-playing games
Lists of novels